Fernando Alberto Morais Dinis (born 25 July 1982) is a Portuguese retired footballer who played as a left back.

Club career
Born in Vila Real, Dinis finished his formative years at Sporting CP, but only represented its reserves as a senior. He made his debut with lowly Associação Desportiva e Cultural de Santa Marta de Penaguião in the fourth tier Terceira Divisão, moving to third tier Segunda Divisão with C.D. Olivais e Moscavide the following season, where he teamed up with Miguel Veloso.

In 2006–07, aged 24, Dinis first competed in the Primeira Liga, appearing in seven matches for Boavista FC. He split the following campaign between C.D. Trofense and C.F. União, and signed with S.C. Beira-Mar of the second tier for 2008–09, having his contract terminated in June 2009 after only five competitive appearances.

Dinis moved abroad in late July 2009, joining Polish club Zagłębie Lubin. He was released on 1 June 2011, after two years in the Ekstraklasa being relatively used.

References

External links

1982 births
Living people
People from Vila Real, Portugal
Portuguese footballers
Association football defenders
Primeira Liga players
Liga Portugal 2 players
Segunda Divisão players
Sporting CP B players
C.D. Olivais e Moscavide players
Boavista F.C. players
C.D. Trofense players
C.F. União players
S.C. Beira-Mar players
Ekstraklasa players
Zagłębie Lubin players
Portuguese expatriate footballers
Expatriate footballers in Poland
Portuguese expatriate sportspeople in Poland
Sportspeople from Vila Real District